Dust: The Lingering Legacy of 9/11 is a 2021 documentary film about the toxic health effects of the dust created by the 9/11 attack on the World Trade Center.

Steve Buscemi is the executive producer of the film.

References

External links
 

2021 documentary films
2021 films
Aftermath of the September 11 attacks